Farmersville is an unincorporated community in Black Township, Posey County, in the U.S. state of Indiana.

History
Farmersville was originally called Yankee Settlement or Yankeetown, and under one of the latter names was settled around the year 1812. The community was originally built up chiefly by New Englanders. A post office was established under the name Farmersville in 1850, and remained in operation until 1902.

Geography

References

Unincorporated communities in Posey County, Indiana
Unincorporated communities in Indiana